Acomita is a place name in the southwestern United States and may refer to:

Acomita, within South Acomita Village, New Mexico
Acomita Lake, New Mexico
North Acomita Village, New Mexico
Acomita Pueblo, a farming colony of Acoma Pueblo on the south bank of Rio San Jose